Osnar Noronha Montani (born 17 December 1991) is a Peruvian footballer currently playing for Club Deportivo Universidad César Vallejo in the Peruvian Primera División, as a forward.

Club career

Colegio Nacional Iquitos
Noronha made his Torneo Descentralizado debut for CNI on 6 December 2009 away to Elías Aguirre Stadium against Juan Aurich. In the 2010 season on September 29, Osnar scored his first professional goal in a 2-1 win against Total Chalaco.

Juan Aurich
On 11 July 2011 it was announced that Noronha would join Juan Aurich on a loan for the rest of the 2011 season. He arrived to the Chiclayo based club alongside notable players such as Roberto Merino and Roberto Guizasola in order to strengthen the team ahead of the final push for the 2011 league title. He made his debut for Juan Aurich on 7 August 2011 in an away league match against Union Comercio, which finished in a 1-1 draw. He started the match from the beginning and was later substituted off for Pedro Ascoy at the start of the second half.

International career
He played for the Peru U20 side in the 2011 South American Youth Championship.

Honours

Club
Juan Aurich
 Torneo Descentralizado (1): 2011

References

External links

1991 births
Living people
People from Iquitos
Association football forwards
Peruvian footballers
Colegio Nacional Iquitos footballers
Juan Aurich footballers
José Gálvez FBC footballers
Club Alianza Lima footballers
Ayacucho FC footballers
Comerciantes Unidos footballers
Carlos A. Mannucci players
Peruvian Primera División players
Peruvian Segunda División players
Peruvian people of Portuguese descent